South Africa competed at the 2020 Summer Olympics in Tokyo. Originally scheduled to take place from 24 July to 9 August 2020, the Games were postponed to 23 July to 8 August 2021, because of the COVID-19 pandemic. It was the nation's eighth consecutive appearance at the Games in the post-apartheid era, and twentieth overall in Summer Olympic history.

A week before the Games started, two football players and a video analyst were tested positive for COVID-19 while staying at the Olympic Village.

Medalists

| width="78%" align="left" valign="top" |

| width="22%" align="left" valign="top" |

Multiple medallists
The following competitors won several medals at the 2020 Olympic Games.

Competitors
The following is the list of number of competitors in the Games. Note that reserves in field hockey and football are not counted:

Artistic swimming

South Africa fielded a squad of two artistic swimmers to compete in the women's duet event, by securing a berth as the highest-ranked pair, not yet qualified, from Africa at the 2019 FINA World Championships in Gwangju, South Korea, heralding the country's return to the sport for the first time since Barcelona 1992.

Athletics (track and field)

Thirty South African athletes achieved the entry standards, either by qualifying time or by world ranking, in the following track and field events (up to a maximum of 3 athletes in each event):

Track & road events
Men

Women

Field events

Cycling

Road
South Africa entered a squad of five riders (three men and two women) to compete in their respective Olympic road races, by virtue of their top 50 national finish (for men) and top 22 (for women) in the UCI World Ranking.

Track
Following the completion of the 2020 UCI Track Cycling World Championships, South African riders accumulated spots for both men and women in the sprint and keirin, as well as the men's omnium and madison, based on their country's results in the final UCI Olympic rankings.

Sprint

Keirin

Omnium

Mountain biking
South Africa entered one rider each to compete in both men's and women's cross-country race, respectively, by virtue of their best individual ranking at the 2019 African Championships.

BMX
South African riders qualified for one men's quota place in BMX at the Olympics, by accepting a continental berth for Africa from the Union Cycliste Internationale based on its rankings of June 1, 2021.

Diving

South African divers qualified for two individual spots each in the women's springboard, respectively, at the Games through the 2019 African Qualifying Meet in Durban and the 2021 FINA World Cup series in Tokyo.

Equestrian

South Africa entered two riders into the Olympic equestrian competition by the following results: a top two finish each, outside the group selection, of the individual FEI Olympic Rankings for Group F (Africa and Middle East) in both dressage and eventing, respectively.

Dressage
Rio 2016 pair of Seymour and Ramoneur got nominated to compete on June 18, 2021. The Tokyo Olympics are to be the final career international competition for the Oldenburg stallion. Seymour was forced to withdraw while in Tokyo after Ramoneur suffered laminitis.

Qualification Legend: Q = Qualified for the final; q = Qualified for the final as a lucky loser

Eventing

Field hockey

Summary

Men's tournament

South Africa men's field hockey team qualified for the Olympics by winning the 2019 Men's African Olympic Qualifier in Stellenbosch.

Team roster

Group play

Women's tournament

South Africa women's field hockey team qualified for the Olympics by winning the 2019 Women's African Olympic Qualifier in Stellenbosch.

Team roster

Group play

Football (soccer)

Summary

Men's tournament

South Africa men's football team qualified for the Games by winning the bronze medal and securing the last of three available berths of the 2019 Africa U-23 Cup of Nations.

Team roster

Group play

Golf

South Africa entered two golfers (both men) into the Olympic tournament. Christiaan Bezuidenhout (world no. 46), Garrick Higgo (world no. 38), and Ashleigh Buhai (world no. 76) qualified directly among the top 60 eligible players for their respective events based on the IGF World Rankings. Louis Oosthuizen and Lee-Anne Pace were initially selected but opted not to play. Ashleigh Buhai later withdrew and was replaced by Paula Reto who also withdrew.

Gymnastics

Artistic
South Africa entered two artistic gymnast into the Olympic competition. Caitlin Rooskrantz received a spare berth from the women's apparatus events, as one of the twelve highest-ranked gymnasts, neither part of the team nor qualified directly through the all-around, at the 2019 World Championships in Stuttgart, Germany. Meanwhile, Naveen Daries claimed an additional place to join Rooskrantz on the South African squad with a bronze-medal finish in the women's individual all-around at the 2021 African Championships in Cairo, Egypt.

Women

Judo

South Africa qualified one judoka for the women's extra-lightweight category (48 kg) at the Games. Geronay Whitebooi received a continental berth from Africa as the nation's top-ranked judoka outside of direct qualifying position in the IJF World Ranking List of June 28, 2021.

Rowing

South Africa qualified one boat in the men's pair by finishing third in the B-final and securing ninth out of eleven berths available at the 2019 FISA World Championships in Ottensheim, Austria. Meanwhile, the men's coxless four rowers were added to the South African roster with their top-two finish at the 2021 FISA Final Qualification Regatta in Lucerne, Switzerland.

Qualification Legend: FA=Final A (medal); FB=Final B (non-medal); FC=Final C (non-medal); FD=Final D (non-medal); FE=Final E (non-medal); FF=Final F (non-medal); SA/B=Semifinals A/B; SC/D=Semifinals C/D; SE/F=Semifinals E/F; QF=Quarterfinals; R=Repechage

Rugby sevens

Summary

Men's tournament

The South Africa national rugby sevens team qualified by advancing to the quarterfinals in the 2019 London Sevens, securing a top four spot in the 2018–19 World Rugby Sevens Series.

Team roster

Group play

Quarter-finals

Semi-finals

5th place match

Sailing

South African sailors qualified one boat in each of the following classes through the 2018 Sailing World Championships, the class-associated Worlds, and the continental regattas.

M = Medal race; EL = Eliminated – did not advance into the medal race

Skateboarding

South Africa entered four skateboarders (two per gender) to compete across all events at the Games. Dallas Oberholtzer (men's park), Brandon Valjalo (men's street), Melissa Williams (women's park), and Boipelo Awuah (women's street) granted an invitation from the World Skate as the highest-ranked skateboarders from Africa vying for qualification in the street and park events based on their performances in the federation's Olympic Rankings of June 30, 2021.

Sport climbing

South Africa entered two sport climbers into the Olympic tournament. Erin Sterkenburg and Christopher Cosser qualified directly for the women's and men's combined events, respectively, by advancing to the final stage and eventually winning the gold medal at the 2020 IFSC African Championships in Cape Town.

Surfing

South Africa sent two surfers (one per gender) to compete in their respective shortboard races at the Games. Bianca Buitendag secured a qualification slot for her nation in the women's shortboard as the highest-ranked and last remaining surfer from Africa at the 2019 ISA World Surfing Games in Miyazaki, Japan. On the men's side, Jordy Smith finished within the top ten of those eligible for qualification in the World Surf League rankings to join Buitendag on the South African roster for Tokyo 2020.

Swimming 

Seventeen South African swimmers achieved qualifying standards in the following events (up to a maximum of two swimmers in each event at the Olympic Qualifying Time (OQT), and potentially one at the Olympic Selection Time (OST)): To assure their selection to the Olympic team, swimmers must attain an Olympic qualifying cut in each individual pool event at the 2021 South African National Championships (April 8 to 12) in Johannesburg.

Seventeen swimmers (eight men and nine women) were officially named to the South African roster for the Games on June 24, 2021, including London 2012 gold medalist Chad Le Clos in the men's butterfly double and 2019 world silver medalist and national record holder Tatjana Schoenmaker in the women's breaststroke double.

Men

Women

Triathlon

Individual

Water polo

South Africa qualified to compete in the men's water polo tournament for the first time since Rome 1960, and in the women's water polo tournament for the first time ever.

Summary

Men's tournament

Team roster

Group play

Women's tournament

Team roster

Group play

See also
South Africa at the 2020 Summer Paralympics

References

Nations at the 2020 Summer Olympics
2020
2021 in South African sport